Jarice  is a village in the municipalities of Ribnik, Republika Srpska and Ključ, Bosnia and Herzegovina.

Demographics 
According to the 2013 census, its population was nil, so none in Ključ and none in the Ribnik part.

References

Populated places in Ključ
Populated places in Ribnik